Angrej Ali (born Angrez Ali Khan) is a Punjabi record producer, musician and singer-songwriter. His 2008 album, Ik Din, was produced by Aman Hayer. His 5 Duo Collaboration with Aman Hayer & Jeeti are Groundshaker in 2005, Groundshaker 2 in 2008, Pure Platinum in 2010, Jukebox in 2010 & The Entourage in 2011.

Angrej Ali performed at the annual Mehfil Mela Festival on 3 September 2006, in Brampton, and was among those artists honored at the commemoration festivity marking the 109th birthday of late Justice Gurnam Singh in February 2008.

Singles

Discography

Filmography

References

External links
 Discography on Sada Punjab

Bhangra (music)
People from Firozpur district
Living people
English people of Indian descent
Punjabi people
1972 births